Lapidary style is prose that is appropriate for memorials, mausoleums, stelae, and other commemorations in which words are "etched in stone"; it is concise, pithy, elegant, and sententious.  The meaning extends to text in that style which is printed on paper rather than carved into monuments.

Style (fiction)
Sculpture
www.dictionary.com, www.m-w.com